Sir Julian Goldsmid, 3rd Baronet, DL, JP (8 October 1838 – 7 January 1896) was a British lawyer, businessman and Liberal (later Liberal Unionist) politician who sat in the House of Commons between 1866 and 1896.

Background and early life 
Goldsmid was the son of Frederick Goldsmid and his wife Caroline Samuel. His father was a banker and Member of Parliament for Honiton. Goldsmid was educated privately until he entered University College, London. In 1864 he became a fellow of University College, and was also called to the bar.  After a brief period on the Oxford circuit, he gave up practicing law when he was elected to parliament.

Career 
Goldsmid was first stood for Parliament at a by-election in February 1864 for the borough of Brighton, without success, and he was defeated again at the 1865 general election, when he contested Cirencester. He was elected unopposed as a Member of Parliament (MP) for Honiton at a by-election in March 1866. In that year, Goldsmid inherited Somerhill House near Tonbridge, Kent, on the death of his father. Honiton was disfranchised in 1868 by the Reform Act of 1867 and at the 1868 general election Goldsmid stood unsuccessfully for Mid Surrey. He was elected for Rochester at a by-election in 1870 and held the seat until his defeat at the 1880 general election. In 1879, Goldsmid began expanding Somerhill to accommodate his large family - he had eight daughters. The work took until 1897 to complete.

He then contested a by-election in May 1880 for Sandwich, and was returned to the Commons after a five-year absence at the 1885 general election as MP for St Pancras South, holding that seat until his death in 1896. In 1894 Goldsmid was deputy Speaker of the House of Commons.

In 1878 Goldsmid succeeded his uncle, Sir Francis Goldsmid to the baronetcy and to the estate of Whiteknights Park at Earley in Berkshire, as well as others in Sussex, Kent and elsewhere. He also bore the Portuguese title of Baron de Goldsmid e da Palmeira. His business interests included being chairman of the Submarine Telegraph Company and the Imperial and Continental Gas Association, and he was a director of the London, Brighton, and South Coast Railway. A steam locomotive was named Goldsmid after him in 1892.

Goldsmid was treasurer of University College in 1880-81 and was a member of the council of University College Hospital. He was vice-chancellor of the University of London when he died. He was Deputy lieutenant of Kent, Sussex, and Berkshire, J. P.  for Kent, Sussex, and London, colonel of the 1st Sussex Rifle Volunteers, and honorary colonel of the 1st Sussex Artillery Volunteers.

Goldsmid was one of many who was concerned about the Russian persecutions on Jewish community of 1881. He was assigned as chairman of a fund that focused on the relief of Russo-Jewish refugees. This fund supported the Board of Guardians, a body that performed the Russian exodus into England. The number of refugees permanently residing in London was not large. The majority of refugees continued their voyage to America.

Marriage
In 1868, Goldsmid married Virginia Philipson of Florence and had eight daughters. As he had no son, his entailed property passed to a male relative, his house in Piccadilly being converted into the Isthmian Club.

Deaths
Goldsmid died at the age of 57 at Brighton where his grandfather, Sir Isaac Goldsmid had purchased the Wick Estate in 1830. "Julian Road" in the estate is named after him.

References

External links 
 

1838 births
1896 deaths
Baronets in the Baronetage of the United Kingdom
English Jews
English people of Dutch-Jewish descent
English justices of the peace
Liberal Party (UK) MPs for English constituencies
UK MPs 1865–1868
UK MPs 1868–1874
UK MPs 1874–1880
UK MPs 1885–1886
UK MPs 1886–1892
UK MPs 1892–1895
Deputy Lieutenants of Kent
Deputy Lieutenants of Sussex
Deputy Lieutenants of Berkshire
Alumni of University College London
Academics of University College London
Vice-Chancellors of the University of London
People from Earley
People from Tonbridge
Jewish British politicians
Liberal Unionist Party MPs for English constituencies
Members of the Privy Council of the United Kingdom
Julian
Members of the Parliament of the United Kingdom for Honiton
Burials at Balls Pond Road Cemetery